Sweetness is a 1995 novel by Swedish author Torgny Lindgren. It won the August Prize in 1995.

Brothers. The final confession (Ukrainian: Брати. Остання сповідь) is a 2013 Ukrainian drama film directed by Viktoria Trofimenko. The film is based on Torgny Lindgren's novel Sweetness, which was published in 1995.

References

1995 Swedish novels
Swedish-language novels
August Prize-winning works
Novels set in Västerbotten